Ferencvárosi TC (sports club) is a sport society in Ferencváros, Hungary. It may also refer to:

 Ferencvárosi TC - men's football club
 Ferencvárosi TC (women's football) - women's football club
 Ferencvárosi TC (men's handball) - men's handball club
 Ferencvárosi TC (women's handball) - women's handball club
 Ferencvárosi TC (ice hockey) - ice hockey club
 Ferencvárosi TC (men's water polo) - men's water polo club
 Ferencvárosi TC (women's water polo) - women's water polo club